Blood in May is a 2008 Spanish film directed by José Luis Garci and starring Quim Gutiérrez and Paula Echevarría. The plot is inspired on work by Benito Pérez Galdós and takes place around the events of 2 May 1808, when the people of Madrid rose up in rebellion against French occupation. The film was one of three films Spain submitted to be nominated for the Academy Award for Best Foreign Language Film. The film was disappointing in terms of audience and critical reception.

Plot
Year 1808. The young Gabriel Araceli is working as a typesetter in a modest printing of Madrid. His girlfriend, Inés, is a pretty orphan girl living in Aranjuez, hosted by his uncle, the evil Don Celestino Santos. During his visit to the Royal Site to see the bride, Gabriel coincides with the historic uprising of 19 March against Godoy, whose palace is assaulted by the mob. Thinking about the girl's sake, Don Celestino consent to Inez moved to Madrid to live with their relatives also Don Mauro Requejo and sister Restituta. Gabriel, to be near his girlfriend, in response to a notice is provided as a waiter in the shop. With the help of the boy John of God, who is in love with the girl, tries to kidnap Agnes, for Don Mauro seeks nothing less than to marry her himself. And after many vicissitudes, Gabriel gets away with taking advantage Ines tumultuous reception that the people of Madrid surrenders to the new King Ferdinand, the Desired. They plan to flee to Cádiz, the birthplace of the boy, but times go scrambled because, under the pretext of their way to Portugal, Napoleon's troops entered Spain. The French soldiers are not popular among the population of Madrid, which regards them as invaders. And on 2 May, the popular revolt against imperial outposts breaks out. And, incidentally, Gabriel Araceli is involved in the fierce battles taking place in the Puerta del Sol and elsewhere in Madrid.

Cast

Production 
The production featured a large €15 million budget. The public subsidies provided by the right-leaning regional administration of Madrid represented the largest ever for a Spanish film.

Release 
Distributed by Alta Classics, the film was theatrically released in Spain on 3 October 2008. It proved to be a massive box-office failure, only grossing €0.7 million in the first month of its theatrical run.

Reception 
Jonathan Holland of Variety deemed the film to be "an ambitious, often intriguing 200th-anniversary retelling" of the Dos de Mayo uprising in which Garci is seen "aiming for that grand, sweeping feel but failing to achieve it".

Javier Ocaña of El País assessed that Garci (with help from Valcárcel) had managed to craft a "solid" work, finding himself comfortable in street conversations, also considering that he had found the "perfect" Gabriel Araceli created by Galdós in the naturalist performance of Gutiérrez, but, that, when the time for the outburst of violence comes, the film falls short.

Accolades 

|-
| align = "center" rowspan = "14" | 2009 || rowspan = "7" | 64th CEC Medals || colspan = "2" | Best Film ||  || align = "center" rowspan = "7" | 
|-
| Best Director || José Luis Garci ||  
|-
| Best Supporting Actor || Miguel Rellán || 
|-
| Best Supporting Actress || Tina Sáinz || 
|-
| Best Adapted Screenplay || José Luis Garci, Horacio Valcárcel || 
|-
| Best Cinematography || Félix Monti || 
|-
| Best Music || Pablo Cervantes || 
|-
| rowspan  = "7" | 23rd Goya Awards || Best Supporting Actress || Tina Sáinz ||  || rowspan = "7" | 
|-
| Best Cinematography || Félix Monti || 
|-
| Best Art Direction || Gil Parrondo || 
|-
| Best Costume Design || Lourdes de Orduña || 
|-
| Best Makeup and Hairstyles || Alicia López, Josefa Morales, Romana González || 
|-
| Best Sound || José Antonio Bermúdez, Miguel Rejas || 
|-
| Best Special Effects || Alberto Nombela, Juan Ramón Molina || 
|}

See also 
 List of Spanish films of 2008

References

External links
 

2008 films
Spanish historical drama films
2000s Spanish-language films
Films with screenplays by José Luis Garci
Films set in Madrid
Films set in 1808
Films set in the Community of Madrid
Films directed by José Luis Garci
2000s Spanish films